Pune–Lucknow Superfast Express is a Superfast Express train of the Indian Railways connecting  in Maharashtra and  of Uttar Pradesh. It is currently being operated with 12103/12104 train numbers on a weekly basis.

Service

The 12103/Pune–Lucknow Jn Superfast Express has an average speed of 59.2 km/hr and covers 1481 km in 24 hrs 55 mins. 12104/Lucknow Jn–Pune Superfast Express has an average speed of 58 km/hr and covers 1481 km in 25 hrs 35 mins.

Route and halts 

The important halts of the train are:

Coach composition

The train has standard ICF rakes with max speed of 110 kmph. The train consists of 16 coaches:

 1 AC II Tier
 2 AC III Tier
 5 Sleeper coaches
 6 General
 2 Second-class Luggage/parcel van

Traction

Both trains are hauled by a Bhusawal Loco Shed based WAP-4 electric locomotive from Pune to Lucknow and vice versa.

Direction reversal

The train reverses its direction 1 times:

Rake Share 

This train shares a rake with:-

 Pune–Lucknow Express
 Pune–Amravati Express
 Pune–Danapur Superfast Express
 Pune–Manduadih Gyan Ganga Express

See also 

 Pune–Lucknow Express
 Pune–Amravati Express
 Pune–Danapur Superfast Express
 Pune–Manduadih Gyan Ganga Express

Notes

External links 

 12103/Pune-Lucknow Jn Superfast Express India Rail Info
 12104/Lucknow Jn-Pune Superfast Express India Rail Info

References 

Express trains in India
Rail transport in Maharashtra
Rail transport in Madhya Pradesh
Passenger trains originating from Lucknow
Transport in Pune
Railway services introduced in 2015